, is a Japanese manga written and illustrated by Yukiko Sumiyoshi. The manga was serialized in Enterbrain's manga magazine Comic B's-Log. The individual chapters were collected into three bound volumes,which were published by Enterbrain between March 1, 2007, and May 1, 2008. It was licensed in English by Tokyopop, which released the manga as an omnibus on October 12, 2010. The manga is also licensed Australasia by Madman Entertainment and in Taiwan by Tong Li Publishing.

Reception
Anime News Network's Lissa Patillo commends the manga for its "easy to understand plot that takes time to focus on compelling cast of secondary character; attractive artwork", but criticizes it for a "weak opening volume; Hijiri doesn't make for a strong main character and the ending leaves something to be desired". Anime News Network's Carlo Santos commends the manga for its promising start but then criticizes the manga for using deus ex machina in the grand finale. The Manga Critic's Katherine Dacey heavily pans the manga as being "bland" and that the story "feels like a clip-and-paste job, borrowing elements from more popular series and reassembling them into a less entertaining copy." Sequential Tart's Karen Maeda lightly criticizes the manga with "the art is a little bit rough and could use some more detail, but it’s pretty easy to follow. The dialog also follows about in the same way as the art, but it’s pretty easy to understand the plot and what is going on." Comic Book Bin's Chris Zimmerman comments on the plot of the manga with "the pacing of the series feels off kilter for the first third of the volume, with the main plot seemingly heading nowhere. This changes when the focus shifts to Hijiri and for that reason, the omnibus format actually enhances the readability of the series as a whole. Had the volumes been published individually, the first volume's lack of story progression and overly repetitive nature could have possibly driven readers away before the series had a chance to kick into high gear. As it stands, the omnibus format makes Black Gate more accessible.

References

External links

Tong Li Publishing titles
Fantasy anime and manga
2007 manga
Shōjo manga
Tokyopop titles
Enterbrain manga